NA-114 Sheikhupura-II is a constituency for the National Assembly of Pakistan.

Area
During the delimitation of 2018, NA-120 (Sheikhupura-II) acquired areas from three former constituencies namely NA-132 (Sheikhupura-II-cum-Nankana Sahib), NA-133 (Sheikhupura-III), and NA-136 Nankana Sahib-II-cum-Sheikhupura, the areas of Sheikhupura District which are part of this constituency are listed below alongside the former constituency name from which they were acquired:

Areas acquired from NA-132 Sheikhupura-II-cum-Nankana Sahib
Sharak Pur Tehsil
Following areas of Ferozewala Tehsil
Kot Abdul Malik
Abul Khair (excluding Galo and Kala)
Kot Pindi Das (excluding Khanpur, Mandiali and Chak No. 46)
Wandala Dial Shah
Faizpur Khurd

Areas acquired from NA-133 (Sheikhupura-III)
Following areas of Ferozewala Tehsil
Galo
Kala
Khanpur
Mandiali
Following areas of Sheikhupura Tehsil
Mudke
Muradey Kalan
Ghazi Androon
Noor Pur Virkan

Areas acquired from NA-136 Nankana Sahib-II-cum-Sheikhupura
Following areas of Sheikhupura Tehsil
Baharianwala (excluding Mudke, Muradey Kalan, Ghazi Androon, Noor Pur Virkan, Sahuki Malian, and Jevanpur Kalan)
Malowal
Bahuman
Hoeke

Members of Parliament

2018-2022: NA-120 Sheikhupura-II

Election 2018 

General elections were held on 25 July 2018.

See also
NA-113 Sheikhupura-I
NA-115 Sheikhupura-III

References 

NA-120